Malmesbury was a hundred of the English county of Wiltshire, lying in the north of the county and centring on the historic borough and market town of Malmesbury. The hundred of Malmesbury represents parishes that were within the Domesday hundreds of Chedglow and Startley, which were held at farm by the Abbot of Malmesbury.

Extent
The hundred contained the parishes of Bremilham, Brinkworth, Brokenborough, Charlton, Crudwell, Dauntsey, Draycot Cerne, Foxley, Garsdon, Hankerton, Hullavington, Lea and Cleverton, Malmesbury (including Corston and Rodbourne), Norton, Oaksey, Seagry, Great Somerford, Little Somerford, Stanton St Quintin, Sutton Benger, and Westport.

In 1086 the ancient hundred of Chedglow had contained the parishes of:
Ashley
Brokenborough
Charlton
Crudwell
Garsdon
Hankerton
Kemble
Lea
Minety
Long Newnton
Oaksey
Poole Keynes

In 1086 the ancient hundred of Startley contained the parishes of:
Brinkworth
Christian Malford
Dauntsey
Draycot Cerne
Foxley
Hullavington
Norton
Seagry
Somerford
Great Somerford
Little Somerford
Sutton Benger

Notes

Hundreds of Wiltshire